Animefest is the oldest anime convention in The Czech Republic, Europe.

Animefest was held for the first time in 2004. It was and still is organised by Brněnští Otaku (translated as Brno otaku), at first a free group of otaku. As time went by, the convention became too large and for better organisation, a civic association Brněnští Otaku was founded in 2007.
Animefest is one of the two largest conventions held in The Czech Republic, having around the same number of visitors as Advík, which is held in Prague, in July.
Animefest holds Anime Music Video competition, the main prize of it being a plush doll of Totoro. This competition is held yearly since the first year of Animefest and because of that it is considered the main event of the year for most of Czech AMV creators. From 2010 to 2016, cosplay contest at Animefest is part of EuroCosplay event. Since 2017, group cosplay contest is qualifier for Clara Cow's Cosplay Cup. Since 2018, Animefest cosplay contest is part of European Cosplay Gathering.

History

Due to regulations related to COVID-19 pandemic, 2020 and 2021 edition of Animefest had to be cancelled.

References

External links
Official website of Animefest convention
Official Youtube channel (with reports and event recordings)
A report about Animefest 2009 in Denik Rovnost, Brno press
A report about Animefest 2010 in Denik Rovnost, Brno press
Report about Animefest 2010 by Studio Pierrot

Anime conventions
Recurring events established in 2004
2004 establishments in the Czech Republic